Love You to Death (formerly: The Pettit Project) was a pop punk band from Toronto, Ontario, Canada formed in 1999, signed to Affluence Music Group.

History
The Pettit Project was featured on the Drive-Thru Records stage of the Vans Warped Tour in 2002. They've played with several established bands over the years, including Fefe Dobson, similar-sounding pop group Hellogoodbye, and appeared on a mini-tour with Hedley (band) in 2006.

The Pettit Project was featured in season 2, episode 4 of the Canadian television series Radio Free Roscoe, "These Bossy Boots are Made for Walking", in 2004, where Lily, played by Kate Todd, attempts to arrange an interview with the band for RFR. An interview is arranged over the phone with Scott Komer, however it doesn't go well. Komer begins to express his frustration for having to always answer the same questions, so Ray decides to take control in an attempt to save the interview. Ray then visits Mickey's where The Pettit Project is preparing for their live set; He explains to the band how he's trying to make amends with his friend. The Pettit Project then performs their song "99 Lives" at the school dance, followed by a cover of Lily's song "Don't Tell Me What To Do", repairing Lily and Ray's friendship.

The Pettit Project became a major player on the web with over 119,000 plays on MySpace; 150,000 plays on MP3.com; and 240,500 plays on PureVolume.

They became Love You to Death, in February 2008, as a response to their frustration with people being unable to accurately pronounce or spell their band name. An example of this would be "Petite Project".

Love You to Death opened for Silverstein (band) at the El Mocambo, in April 2010, for the Decade (Live at the El Mocambo) show.

With fifteen releases over the past sixteen years, their members have included musicians that went on to be in Avril Lavigne’s band, Not By Choice and Boys Night Out.

Love You to Death announced they were breaking up in November 2015 after releasing their final EP "Our Final Release 'Cause Paul's Dead".

The Pettit Project reunited in July 2014 with Scott Komer and former band members: Alison "the ton" Morris and Boys Night Out lead vocalist Connor Lovat-Fraser to record their live-off-the-floor album, "The Secret Diary of Allan's Kid", with the help of drummer Sam Guaiana and bassist Paul Shields. The album was released in August 2016 and features songs from the band's early years.

Scott Komer and Sam Guaiana have reunited with former Pettit Project member Bob Anderson to form the Toronto-based punk band Terror Ruins Birthdays.

Discography

Albums
 The Secret Diary of Allan's Kid (2016)
(As 'The Pettit Project')
 "As Soon As We're Back Home"
 "You're Champagne, and I'm Shiznit"
 "I'll Bury You at Makeout Creek"
 "Used (To Being Alone)"
 "Even If You Don't"
 "Katie"
 "Simple Song, Simple Plan"
 "Bury Me at Makeout Creek"
 "Scott And Connor Are Both Dorks"
 "When Scott Got Dumped"
 "Guess I Gotta Guess"
 "Oh, I'll Get Her Alright"

 If You Want to Make God LOL, Text Him Your Plans (2013)
 "Beacon, Lighthouse, Marco Polo "
 "Throwdown! "
 "Jack and Jager "
 "Kickin' Ass and Rippin' Throats "
 "Finishing Moves (ft. Deshaun Clarke) "
 "You Make Me Stupid "
 "Inside "
 "NowHere "
 "We'll Shout For You "
 "Sweet Picture Frame, Babe "
 "Armed and Dangerous "

 The Day I Lost Everything (2011)
 "(Second Chances For) Second Chances"
 "Do You"
 "Disappear Here"
 "Only Happy When I'm Not"
 "I'm Spoken For"
 "Groundhog Day"
 "So Damn Cute"
 "I Don't Think That This Will Happen"
 "Back in 9th Grade"
 "Francis"
 "She Doesn't Believe M'words"

 Recipe For a Ghost (2010)
 "That’s What Girls Do"
 "Just a Little Booty (2 Terms of Endearment)"
 "I Once Had"
 "There’s a Big F’in Elephant in the Room"
 "Caught You Staring"
 "Your Dedication"
 "It’s Part of Me"
 "A Rebound Shouldn’t Last Long"
 "September 4th"
 "Saturday Sat Alone"
 "I Rule You Suck"

 R.I.P., Cupcake (2008)
 "Jump, Baby"
 "99 Lives"
 "What I Want"
 "Guess I Gotta Guess"
 "Fully Aware, Fully Prepared"
 "Oh, I’ll Get Her Alright"

 Super Awesome Best Party (2007)
 "Mr. Obvious"
 "Love Is in the Air"
 "Second Chances"
 "For Miles in Denial"
 "LOV"
 "Get Me the Rock Outta Here"
 "Me Moving on from Me"
 "Left on McCraney"
 "I'm Down with That"
 "If I Had a Dime"
 "Disclaimer!"
 "Pretty City, Bad Times"

 6 Week Summer Vacation in Hell (2005)
(As 'The Pettit Project')
 "Wishingly Waiting Patiently"
 "Gonna Leave You in the Summertime"
 "Time Apart"
 "Heartbroken"
 "Everytime, Girl o' Mine"
 "The Sad Clown"
 "A Life Divine"
 "NYC"
 "Not Perfect Is Me"
 "Lauren (I Will Wait for You)"
 "Perfect Summer"

 cheROCKracy (2004)
(as ‘The Pettit Project’)

 "3 Cheers 4 Me"
 "Used (to be alone)"
 "99 Lives"
 "When Scott Got Dumped"
 "Cutie Stalker McCutie-Stalk"
 "I’ll Bury You at Makeout Creek"
 "Autobot Lovesong"
 "Girlington"

 All The Pettit Project Wants for Christmas is for People to Stop Calling Them 'Petite Project' (2004)
(as ‘The Pettit Project’)

 "Mistletopriation of Funds"
 "Stupid Christmas Song"
 "How Do You Giftwrap a Young Boy’s First Broken Heart?"
 "Disclaimer! (demo)"

Band

Past members
 Scott Komer – vocals, guitar
 Christine "Tuba" Wallis – keytar, vocals
 Sam Guaiana – drums
 Paul Shields – bass, vocals
 Alison "the ton" Morris – vocals, keyboards
 Connor Lovat-Fraser (singer for Boys Night Out) – vocals, guitar
 Mark Speer – vocals, guitar
 Gregory Perets (now known as Gregory Pepper) – vocals, guitar
 Bob Anderson – guitar
 Dave Partridge – vocals, guitar
 Jeff Davis (guitarist for Boys Night Out) – bass
 Charles Moniz (former bass player for Avril Lavigne) – bass
 Neil Hamilton – bass
 Fatty McGinty (keyboardist for The Creepshow) – keys
 Dave Palmer – bass
 Liam Killeen (drummer for Not By Choice) – drums
 Matt McCausland – drums
 Shawn Butchart – drums
 Corey Wood (drummer for Cuff the Duke) – drums
 Dave Thomas – keyboards, vocals
 Hugo Troccoli – keyboards, vocals

See also
 Boys Night Out
 Not by Choice

External links
 Love You to Death official website
 The Pettit Project official website
 Terror Ruins Birthdays official website

Canadian power pop groups
Canadian punk rock groups